The Centre of Research in Theories and Practices that Overcome Inequalities (CREA) was founded in 1991 by a current professor of Sociology at the University of Barcelona, Doctor Honoris Causa of West University of Timișoara and also a recognized researcher in Europe in the Social Science area, Ramon Flecha. After Ramon Flecha's resignation as the Director of CREA, in 2006; Marta Soler, Doctor by Harvard, a current Professor of Sociological Theory, assumed the post. Nowadays, the name of the research centre has changed for this other CREA- Community of Researchers on Excellence for All.
CREA, one of the centres that first joined the Scientific Park of Barcelona (University of Barcelona); is indisciplinary;  multicultural  and open accepting different ideologies, religions, lifestyles, sexual orientations; transparent, since its knowledge is at everyone's disposal; and it is a centre where the validity of arguments prevails over the positions of power of their members, creating, in this way, an environment of an egalitarian dialogue. This centre is formed by University research professors, researchers and professional collaborators of diverse disciplines (sociology, pedagogy, economy, mathematics, communication, biology, etc.).

Methodology
All the research CREA carries out is done with the direct collaboration of the subjects researched, using the critical communicative methodology. The subject of research is directly included providing its interpretations, experiences and opinions, enriching, in this way, the research. It is about facilitating the participation of the researched in the research through an egalitarian dialogue with the researcher where validity claims prevail over power ones.

Lines of research
The Research Centre carries out both, international and national projects developing the following lines of research:

 Dialogic Theories (including the Critical Communicative Research Methodology and Speech Acts, Social uses of the information and Communication technologies).
 Cultural Groups (Roma, Arab- Muslim and Jewish community) and migration
 Learning Communities
 Gender (Gender Violence)
 Governance and Active Citizenship

Groups
And from the lines of research described above, five groups were created by CREA:
	Roma Studies Group
	Jewish Studies Group
	Alhiwar Arab-Muslim Group
	Interreligious Dialogue
	SAFO CREA Women’s Group

International dimension
CREA is, today, internationally well- known for its international research oriented to overcoming inequalities; already present in Europe and in various countries such as Brazil, United States, Korea or Australia.
Concretely, from its origins, CREA has collaborated with international research groups, as well as with different authors of the Scientific International Community. Some of the seminars were held with important authors such as: Paulo Freire (1994), Ulrich Beck and Elisabeth Beck Gernsheim(1998), Alain Touraine (1999), Jon Elster (2001), Judith Butler ( 2001), Alejandro Portes (2002), Gordon Wells(2003), John Searle (2003) or Gary Orfield (2003).

Different members of CREA have given lectures and seminars at several universities in Brazil, United States, Germany, Australia, Korea and others. Ramon Flecha participated in The Harvard Education Forum celebrated on February 27, 1998; in honor of Paulo Freire, alongside important international referents such as: Noam Chomsky (Institute Professor and Professor of Linguistics, MIT), Eileen de los Reyes (Moderator, Assistant Professor HGSE), Carolyn Higgins (Earlhm College), Yamila Hussein (HGSE master's degree candidate), Donaldo Macedo (UMass Boston), Nancy Richardson (associate dean for ministry, Harvard Divinity School), Ira Shor (City College of New York).

In addition, and as another example, in 2008, professor of Sociological Theory and director of CREA, Marta Soler, gave two lectures about literary gatherings and Community involvement for social change  and about the role of critical communicative methodology in Overcoming social exclusion; and led a seminar at the Havens Center for Study of Social of Structure and Social Change, in the University of Wisconsin- Madison.

See also
Critical communicative methodology
Dialogic learning
CREA struggle against VAW in Universities

References

Further reading
Gómez, J., Latorre A., Sánchez M., Flecha R. (2006): Metodología Comunicativa Crítica. Barcelona: El Roure.
 Puigvert, L. (2014). Preventive Socialization of Gender Violence Moving Forward Using the Communicative Methodology of Research. Qualitative Inquiry, 20(7), 839–843. doi: 10.1177/1077800414537221
Vieites, M. (September 28, 2006). Los Sueños son posibles. Mejorar la realidad sin sueños es imposible. Escuela, 3.717 (1.075), 26- 27.

External links
 Centre of Research in Theories and Practices that Overcome Inequalities (CREA) , retrieved 13 January 2010. Official Website of CREA (Centre of Research in Theories and Practices that Overcome Inequalities).
 Soler, M. (2008). Beyond Bourdieu: Community Involvement for Social Change- Audio. Havens Center. University of Wisconsin- Madison, retrieved 13 January 2010.
 Soler, M. (2008). Overcoming Social Exclusion: The Role of Critical Communicative Methodology- Audio. Havens Center. University of Wisconsin- Madison., retrieved 13 January 2010.

Research institutes in Spain
Social sciences organizations
Research institutes established in 1991
1991 establishments in Spain